The House of Nostitz is the name of an old and influential Silesian aristocratic family, whose members occupied many important positions within Holy Roman Empire and later in Austria, Bohemia and Germany.

History 
The family was named after Nostitz in Saxony, with its history dating back to 1280 in Oberlausitz, today's Germany. They reigned over the Imperial County of Rieneck from 1673 when it was purchased by Count Johann Hartwig of Nostitz-Rieneck (1610-1683) until 1803 when they sold it to the Princes of Colloredo-Mansfeld. Apart from Nostitz-Rieneck several other branches of the family existed: Nostitz-Unwürde, Nostitz-Jänkendorf, Nostitz-Wallwitz, Nostitz-Drzewiecky, Nostitz-Rokitnitz and Nostitz-Ransen which lived and spread through Prussia, Austria, Bohemia, Poland and Russia.

Notable members 
  (1725–1794), Bohemian nobleman and patron
 Friedrich Moritz, Graf von Nostitz-Rieneck (1728–1796), a field marshal in imperial service to the House of Habsburg
 Johann Nepomuk von Nostitz-Rieneck (1768–1840), nephew of Friedrich Moritz, commanded a cavalry division in the army of the Austrian Empire during the Napoleonic Wars
 August Ludwig von Nostitz (1777–1866), Prussian general, fought in the Waterloo Campaign 
  (1878–1944), writer and salon Dame
 Georg von Nostitz (Georg Karl von Nostitz-Jänkendorf, 1781—1838), German military officer in Imperial Russian service
 Gustav-Adolf von Nostitz-Wallwitz (1898–1945), general in the Wehrmacht of Nazi Germany during World War II
 Nick Nostitz (born 1968), German photographic journalist

Lordships 

 1280: earliest record of the Lords of Nostitz
 1366: Lordship of the Holy Roman Empire
 1631: Barony of the Holy Roman Empire
 1673: purchased the County of Rieneck
 1692: Counts of the Holy Roman Empire

See also 
 Nostitz (disambiguation)
 Rieneck

References 
 Beiträge zur Geschichte des Geschlechts von Nostitz. 2 Hft. Leipzig (1874–76)
 Genealogisches Handbuch des Adels, Band 116, 1998, Adelslexikon

 
Saxon nobility
Moravian noble families
Bavarian noble families